My People Were Fair and Had Sky in Their Hair... But Now They're Content to Wear Stars on Their Brows is the debut album by psychedelic folk band Tyrannosaurus Rex (later known as T. Rex). It was released on 5 July 1968 by record label Regal Zonophone.

Recording, music and sleeve
My People Were Fair was recorded at Advision Studios in London, England in early 1968 and produced by Tony Visconti. Preparatory demo sessions for the album took place at Visconti's London flat as well as studio sessions with producer Joe Boyd. Advision was the first studio in the UK with eight-channel recording equipment. This Advision eight-channel machine was a model 280 made by Scully Recording Instruments, which allowed for far greater recording flexibility than the standard 4-track recorders of the era.

Two of the songs, "Mustang Ford"  and "Hot Rod Mama" (a live BBC radio session) had been recorded earlier by Marc Bolan's pre-Tyrannosaurus Rex band John's Children (the former retitled as "Go Go Girl" after Bolan's departure). Early versions of some of the tracks also appeared on The Beginning of Doves, a collection of demos and early tracks released in 1974.  Journalist Paul Stewart advanced that the extended title album reflected "the faux mysticism of the time, even down to the dedication on the sleeve to Aslan and the Old Narnians" while biographer Mark Paytress wrote that the title and the songs "struck a chord with the whimsy-stricken elements within the British underground.

The record featured Bolan on vocals and guitars, and Steve Peregrin Took on backing vocals, drums, pixiphone and percussion. It also featured disc jockey John Peel, who read a children's story written by Bolan for the album's closing track, "Frowning Atahuallpa (My Inca Love)", which also included a lengthy Hare Krishna chant.

For Bolan, the album's music represented a rejection of the electric guitar-driven music he'd been playing with his previous band, John's Children. The cover art (by George Underwood) and subject matter of many of the songs dealt with the fantasy themes that would pervade much of the subsequent Tyrannosaurus Rex catalogue.  Underwood's artwork was based on Gustave Doré's illustrations of Dante's Inferno.

Release
My People Were Fair was released on 5 July 1968 by Regal Zonophone. It reached No. 15 in the UK Album Chart upon initial release.

The album was paired with Tyrannosaurus Rex's follow-up album Prophets, Seers & Sages: The Angels of the Ages (1968) and reissued in 1972 as a double LP, following the success of T. Rex's Electric Warrior (1971) and The Slider (1972) albums. It reached No. 1 in the UK. The double release remains the longest album title of any UK No. 1 album. In the US it was released by A&M Records as Tyrannosaurus Rex: A Beginning.

In 1985 it was re-released on Sierra Records. An expanded edition CD was released in 2004, which included the mono mix of the album, one single track and three alternate studio takes. A new mono mix was created for a deluxe edition, released in January 2015, which also included home demos for the album recorded by Visconti and exploratory studio sessions with Boyd.

Reception

Retrospective reviews have been favourable. AllMusic praised the album saying,  it "approaches the listener from a totally unique angle" "The Bolan voice [...] blends so perfectly with the bizarre, almost Eastern-sounding instrumentation. Reviewer Dave Thompson called it "an irresistible affair, if absolutely a child of its psychedelically-inclined time". adding, "It's hard not to be drawn to the actual dynamics of My People Were Fair, the uncanny way Tyrannosaurus Rex take the slightest musical instruments, pixie phones, glockenspiels and a Chinese gong included, to make them sound like the heaviest rock & roll band on the planet". In a 5 out of five star review, Paul Stewart of Sunday Express wrote that it was "varied and vibrant". "The textures grab your attention but not in a hard rock, slap you round the face kind of way. This is chill out music from a time before people called it chilling out".

Track listing

Note: There is a short, unlisted title track at the end of side B.

References

External links
 

T. Rex (band) albums
1968 debut albums
Albums produced by Tony Visconti
Regal Zonophone Records albums